The Ikuhane language is a Bantu language spoken in Southern Africa. It is also known as Subia and spoken by the Ikuhane people in Namibia, Botswana & Zambia.

History

The language is called Chikuhane and it gets its name from the second known Subia King, Ikuhane, who reigned from 1575 – 1600. Under his leadership, the people migrated southwards and settled along the Cuando River which is also named the Ikuhane River in his honour. A single Ikuhane person is referred to as Muikuhane while many Ikuhane people are referred to as Baikuhane. The prefix Mu- is singular and the prefix Ba- is plural.

However, Baikuhane are popularly known today as the Subia people. The exonym Subia came from neighbouring people and it is derived from the word ‘subila’ which means light in reference to their light skin complexion. A single Subia person is referred to as Musubia while many Subia people are referred to as Basubia or Masubia. The language is called Chisubia.

Subia text

ChiSubia:
Kakuli IREZA ava saki ahulu inkanda, mane avahi Mwanakwe yenke, ili kuti yense yo zumina Kwakwe keta afwe kono kave nivuhalo vusamani. Johani 3:16

English:
For GOD so loved the world that HE gave HIS only begotten SON, that whoever believes in HIM should not perish but have everlasting life. John 3:16

References

Languages of Botswana
Languages of Namibia
Languages of Zambia